Lead(IV) sulfide is a chemical compound with the formula PbS2. This material is generated by the reaction of the more common lead(II) sulfide, PbS, with sulfur at >600 °C and at high pressures. PbS2, like the related tin(IV) sulfide SnS2, crystallises in the cadmium iodide motif, which indicates that Pb should be assigned the formal oxidation state of 4+.

Lead(IV) sulfide is a p-type semiconductor, and is also a thermoelectric material.

References

Lead(IV) compounds
Sulfides
Dichalcogenides